The Research Center Borstel – Leibniz Lung Center (FZB) is a German interdisciplinary biomedical research institution located in Borstel in Schleswig-Holstein, just north of Hamburg. It is affiliated with the Leibniz Association.

It was founded in 1947 as a research institute with the main focus on tuberculosis and leprosy. From its establishment until 1965 the institute was named the Tuberculosis Research Institute Borstel. A non-profit foundation, it receives a significant part of its funding from the Federal Ministry of Health and the Schleswig-Holstein state government. It has around 520 employees, and is the largest employer in Borstel.

The current director of the center is Stefan Ehlers.

References

 
Leibniz Association
Medical and health organisations based in Schleswig-Holstein
1947 establishments in Germany